"Wonderful Life" is a song by English musical duo Hurts from their debut album, Happiness. It was released as their debut single in Denmark on 3 May 2010 and was released as their second single in the United Kingdom on 22 August 2010. The song peaked at number two in Germany and reached top ten positions in Denmark, Switzerland, Poland and Austria. It also charted in Belgium.

Background
In an interview with entertainment website Digital Spy, lead singer Theo Hutchcraft said of "Wonderful Life": "It's basically based on two extremes: the first being a man who wants to kill himself and the second being love at first sight. He's standing on the bridge about to jump and he's stopped by a woman. They see each other and fall in love. She basically says, 'Come with me, it's all going to be fine'. The song only offers a snippet of someone's life, so we don't know what happens at the end of it."

Critical reception
"Wonderful Life" was well received from music critics. Digital Spy gave the song five out of five stars writing: "Over noirishly simmering synths, frontman Theo Hutchcraft tells the story of a suicidal man saved from jumping off the Severn Bridge by the strike of love at first sight. The rest, quite frankly, speaks for itself. Classy video? Check. Haunting vocals? You got 'em. Epic instrumental breakdown two-thirds of the way through? Seriously, it's all here." The Guardian reviewer Paul Lester wrote: "Wonderful Life is a heart-piercing future classic. Close your eyes and you're transported back to 1987, with the pristine production and melodies." Fraser McAlpine of BBC Chart Blog gave the song four out of five stars and described it as a sad song with "bitterly optimistic lyrics". Brent DiCrescenzo from Time Out Chicago gave "Wonderful Life" four out of five stars and called it a "immaculately crafted, melodramatic pop song[s]" Sarah Walters of City Life gave the song three out of five stars. She felt the song was "a product of the 1980s", and wrote, "There are countless debts in here: the sentimental synth of the Pet Shop Boys or Fiction Factory, the dancefloor savvy of The Beloved, the emotional lyrical arch China Crisis or the dashes of saxophone used by Spandau Ballet and Black". (Coincidentally, Black had a hit with a song of the same title). Chris Maguire of AltSounds gave a mixed review: "It isn't ground-breaking by any means but it is a good example of pop music done well. Sure the lyrics aren't the greatest [...] but the chorus is good and will rattle around in your brain for quite a few hours after you have finished listening to it."

Track listing

Danish digital download
"Wonderful Life" – 4:14

UK CD single
"Wonderful Life" – 4:16
"Affair" – 6:26

UK digital download
"Wonderful Life" (Radio Edit) – 3:34
"Wonderful Life" (Mantronix Remix) – 5:11
"Wonderful Life" (Arthur Baker Remix) – 6:43
"Wonderful Life" (Freemasons Remix Radio Edit) – 3:23
"Wonderful Life" (Freemasons Extended Mix) – 8:28

UK 7" vinyl
"Wonderful Life" – 4:16
"Wonderful Life" (Mantronix Remix) – 5:11

UK 12" picture vinyl
"Wonderful Life" (Arthur Baker Remix) – 6:43
"Wonderful Life" (Arthur Baker Remix Instrumental)

German digital download
"Wonderful Life" – 4:16
"Wonderful Life" (Arthur Baker Remix) – 6:43
"Wonderful Life" (Lexy Remix) – 7:22
"Wonderful Life" (Mantronix Remix) – 5:11

German CD single
"Wonderful Life" – 4:14
"Wonderful Life" (Arthur Baker Remix) – 6:43

Personnel
Hurts – lyrics, music, production
Joseph Cross – music, production
Jonas Quant – additional production
Spike Stent – mixing
George Marino – mastering

Source:

Charts

Weekly charts

Year-end charts

Certifications

Release history

References

External links

2010 singles
Hurts songs
RCA Records singles
Number-one singles in Poland
Songs about suicide
2010 songs
Black-and-white music videos